Gallia County (pronunciation: GAL-yuh) is a county located in the U.S. state of Ohio. As of the 2020 census, the population was 29,220. Its county seat and largest village is Gallipolis.

Named after the French people who originally settled there, its name “Gallia” is the Latin word for Gaul, the ancient region of Western Europe that included present day France. Gallia County is part of the Point Pleasant, WV-OH Micropolitan Statistical Area.

History
Gallia County was formed on March 25, 1803, from portions of Adams and Washington counties. Gallia County had originally been settled by French immigrants, who named the county “Gallia,” the Latin name for Gaul, the ancient region of Western Europe which included present day France.

In the 19th century, the county was settled by numerous migrants from the Upper South, who traveled to the territory by the Ohio River. In the antebellum years, some of its towns became centers of settlement by African Americans, both free blacks (some also from the South) and refugee slaves who had escaped their owners and come across the river to a free state.

In 1818 a group from Wales settled in Gallia County, with Welsh remaining Gallia County's most common second language until 1970.

Geography

Adjacent counties
 Vinton County (north)
 Meigs County (northeast)
 Mason County, West Virginia (east)
 Cabell County, West Virginia (south)
 Lawrence County (southwest)
 Jackson County (northwest)

National protected area
 Wayne National Forest (part)

Demographics

2000 census
As of the census of 2000, there were 31,069 people, 12,060 households, and 8,586 families living in the county. The population density was 66 people per square mile (26/km2). There were 13,498 housing units at an average density of 29 per square mile (11/km2). The racial makeup of the county was 95.26% White, 2.70% Black or African American, 0.43% Native American, 0.35% Asian, 0.15% from other races, and 1.11% from two or more races. 0.61% of the population were Hispanic or Latino of any race.

There were 12,060 households, out of which 33.00% had children under the age of 18 living with them, 56.50% were married couples living together, 11.00% had a female householder with no husband present, and 28.80% were non-families. 25.20% of all households were made up of individuals, and 10.40% had someone living alone who was 65 years of age or older. The average household size was 2.50 and the average family size was 2.98.

In the county, the population was spread out, with 25.00% under the age of 18, 9.70% from 18 to 24, 27.50% from 25 to 44, 24.20% from 45 to 64, and 13.60% who were 65 years of age or older. The median age was 37 years. For every 100 females, there were 95.40 males. For every 100 females age 18 and over, there were 92.10 males.

The median income for a household in the county was $30,191, and the median income for a family was $35,938. Males had a median income of $31,783 versus $22,829 for females. The per capita income for the county was $15,183. About 13.50% of families and 18.10% of the population were below the poverty line, including 25.20% of those under age 18 and 10.00% of those age 65 or over.

2010 census
As of the 2010 United States Census, there were 30,934 people, 12,062 households, and 8,264 families living in the county. The racial makeup of the county was 94.7% white, 2.6% black or African American, 0.5% Asian, 0.4% American Indian, 0.2% from other races, and 1.6% from two or more races. Those of Hispanic or Latino origin made up 0.9% of the population. In terms of ancestry, 18.6% were American, 15.9% were German, 15.6% were Irish, and 8.0% were English.

Of the 12,062 households, 31.9% had children under the age of 18 living with them, 51.9% were married couples living together, 11.6% had a female householder with no husband present, 31.5% were non-families, and 27.0% of all households were made up of individuals. The average household size was 2.49 and the average family size was 2.99. The median age was 39.9 years.

The median income for a household in the county was $37,409 and the median income for a family was $46,470. Males had a median income of $39,301 versus $30,068 for females. The per capita income for the county was $20,199. About 15.8% of families and 21.3% of the population were below the poverty line, including 30.7% of those under age 18 and 14.9% of those age 65 or over.

Politics
Gallia County has been a Republican stronghold ever since that party was formed. Lyndon Johnson in his 1964 landslide is the solitary Democrat to win a majority of the county's vote in the presidential election, although James Buchanan in 1856 and Bill Clinton in 1996 won a plurality.

|}

Communities

Villages
 Centerville
 Cheshire
 Crown City
 Gallipolis (county seat)
 Rio Grande
 Vinton

Townships

 Addison
 Cheshire
 Clay
 Gallipolis
 Green
 Greenfield
 Guyan
 Harrison
 Huntington
 Morgan
 Ohio
 Perry
 Raccoon
 Springfield
 Walnut

Census-designated place
 Kanauga

Unincorporated communities
 Bidwell
 Kerr
 Mercerville
 Patriot

See also
 Grassman
 National Register of Historic Places listings in Gallia County, Ohio
 Scioto Company (1787 - 1790)

References

External links

 Gallia County Government website
 Gallia County Sheriff's website

 
Appalachian Ohio
Counties of Appalachia
Ohio counties on the Ohio River
Point Pleasant micropolitan area
1803 establishments in Ohio
Populated places established in 1803
Welsh-American culture in Ohio